Jana Hlaváčková (born 22 May 1981]) is a former professional Czech tennis player. She won a total of six ITF titles in her career, and reached a doubles ranking high of world No. 193.

Her younger sister is the three-times Grand Slam champion Andrea Sestini Hlaváčková.

ITF Circuit finals

Singles: 5 (5 titles)

Doubles: 6 (1 title, 5 runner-ups)

References

External links
 
 

1981 births
Living people
Sportspeople from Plzeň
Czech female tennis players